"Apni Azadi Ko Hum Hargiz Mita Sakte Nahin" is a popular song from the 1965 film Leader directed by Ram Mukherjee, starring Dilip Kumar and Vyjayanthimala. The song, written by Shakeel Badayuni, composed by Naushad, and originally sung by Mohammed Rafi, is a patriotic song about freedom and the independence from the British occupation of India.

The song has been covered by many artists worldwide, and reissued, together with the film's soundtrack, in 2004 in digital format through Saregama.

See also
Music of India

References

Sources
Journals and magazines

Web

1965 songs
Hindi film songs
Indian patriotic songs
Protest songs
Mohammed Rafi songs
Songs with music by Naushad
Songs with lyrics by Shakeel Badayuni